The 1925 Milwaukee Badgers season was their fourth in the National Football League. The team failed to improve on their previous league record of 5–8, losing all their games. They tied for sixteenth place in the league.

The end of the Badgers’ season was centered on a team scandal with the Chicago Cardinals. The scandal involved a Chicago player, Art Folz, hiring a group of high school football players to play for the Milwaukee Badgers, against the Cardinals. This would ensure an inferior opponent for Chicago. The game was used to help prop up their win-loss percentage and as a chance of wrestling away the 1925 Championship away from the first place Pottsville Maroons. When NFL President Joseph Carr learned high school players had been used in a league game, he told reporters the 59–0 Cardinals win would be stricken from the record. However, the league had never got around to removing it and the game is still a part of the NFL records. Cardinals' owner Chris O'Brien was also fined $1,000 by Carr for allowing his team play a game against high schoolers, even though O'Brien claimed that he was unaware of the players' status. Finally Badgers' owner, Ambrose McGuirk, was ordered to sell his Milwaukee franchise within 90 days. Folz, for his role, was barred from football for life.

However, by the summer of 1926, the $1,000 fine against O'Brien was rescinded, probably since the amount would have put the Cardinals out of business. McGuirk though had already sold his Badgers franchise to Johnny Bryan, a fullback with the Chicago Bears. Two of the high school football players used in scandal even earned high school all-star recognition at the end of their season. Art Folz reportedly told the high schoolers that the game was a "practice game" and would in no part affect their amateur status.

The scandal did have implications for the 1925 NFL Championship, when the Pottsville Maroons had their title removed by the NFL for playing in an unsanctioned game against the Notre Dame All-Stars. To this day, Pottsville residents and supporters still demand to know why Chicago was awarded the title even though they too were found by Carr to have violated the NFL's rules.

Schedule

 Game in italics was against a non-NFL team.
 Game in bold signify the 1925 Chicago Cardinals – Milwaukee Badgers scandal.

Standings

References

Milwaukee Badgers seasons
Milwaukee Badgers
Milwaukee Badgers
National Football League winless seasons